Dayok is a Philippine condiment originating from the islands of Visayas and Mindanao in the Philippines. It is made from fish entrails (usually from yellowfin tuna), excluding the heart and the bile sac. It is fermented with salt, and sometimes rice wine (pangasi) and various herbs. It has a sharp umami and salty flavor very similar to patis (fish sauce) and bagoong. They are sold in sealed glass bottles.

See also

Bekasang, a similar Indonesian preparation
Shiokara, a similar Japanese preparation
Bagoong
Shrimp paste
Fish sauce

References

Fermented fish
Fish sauces
Philippine condiments